Honorary Fellows of Merton College, Oxford.

 Sir Robert Andrew
 Dame Kelly Bacon
 Sir Andrew Baker
 Sir Christopher Ball
 Sir Jack Beatson
 Dinah Birch
 Julian Blackwell
 Alison Blake
 Sir John Boardman
 William Cooke
 Sir Howard Davies
 Francis Finlay
 Gerry Grimstone, Baron Grimstone of Boscobel
 Erich Gruen
 Adam Hart-Davis
 Sir Antony Hoare
 Jonathan Hodgkin
 Bernard Hogan-Howe, Baron Hogan-Howe
 David Holmes
 Sir Jeremy Isaacs
 Sir Alec Jeffreys
 Vassos Karageorghis
 Sir Ian Kershaw
 Sir Anthony Leggett
 Anastasios Leventis
 Sir Brian Leveson
 Richard Levin
 The Most Reverend Michael Lewis
 Sir Callum McCarthy
 HM Emperor Naruhito of Japan
 Martin Ney
 Robert Paxton
 Timothy Phillips
 Martha Piper
 Dame Jessica Rawson
 Sir Martin Read
 Lyndal Roper
 Dana Scott
 Sir Howard Stringer
 Sir Martin Taylor
 Mark Thompson
 Irene Tracey
 Sir Rick Trainor
 Peter Warry
 Sir Guy Weston
 Dame Philippa Whipple
 Rowan Williams, Baron Williams of Oystermouth
 Lady Sue Woodford-Hollick
 Rt Revd Dr Nicholas Wright

 
Merton